San Marcos Airport  is an airport serving the town of San Marcos, in the Sucre Department of Colombia.

See also

Transport in Colombia
List of airports in Colombia

References

External links
OurAirports - San Marcos
SkyVector - San Marcos
HERE/Nokia - San Marcos

Airports in Colombia